Cyranichthys is an extinct marine aulopiform fish genus from Cenomanian-aged marine strata of what is now the Kipala formation in the Congo, Belgium and The Netherlands.  The type species C. ornatissimus is known from Africa, while the newer discovered species, C. jagti, is known from Europe.

The living animal would have had a gar-like or saury-like appearance, although its closest living relatives are lancetfish and lizardfish.

References

 paleodb

Aulopiformes
Prehistoric ray-finned fish genera
Cretaceous fish of Africa
Cretaceous fish of Europe